Águeda Marqués Muñoz (born March 19, 1999) is a Spanish track and field athlete who competes primarily over 1500m on the track, but also competes as a cross-country runner.

Early life
From Segovia, Castile and León, Marqués was a promising youngster, winning the silver medal in the 1000 metres for her age group at the Spanish championships in 2014. In February 2020 she was bronze medalist in the Spanish under-23 indoors championships over 3000m. She became the under-23 champion of Spain over 800 metres on September 30, 2020.

Career

Track
Marqués ran in the 1500m at the 2021 European Athletics Indoor Championships in Torun, Poland, and 
qualified for the final after running a personal best time  of 4:09:94 in the heats. However, after finishing seventh in the final she was disqualified after the event for jostling.
 
Marqués was selected for the 1500m at the 2022 European Athletics Championships. This came after she was runner-up to Marta Perez for the Spanish national 1500 metres title in June 2022.

Marqués was runner-up to Esther Guerrero in the Spanish indoors national championships 1500m in February 2023. She qualified for the final of the 2023 European Athletics Indoor Championships in the 1500 metres. In the final she ran a personal best time of 4.08.72, to finish seventh.

Cross-country
Marqués also competes in cross country running, and with her club won the title of Spanish cross-country champions, in November 2022. She selected to represent Spain in the 2022 European Cross Country Championships in Turin on December 11, 2022. She finished seventeenth in the individual event as the Spanish women finished fourth overall.

References

External links

1999 births
Living people
21st-century Spanish women
Spanish female middle-distance runners
Sportspeople from the Province of Segovia